Heaven is the second studio album by Spanish DJ and producer DJ Sammy. It was released on 6 August 2002.

Singles
The title track and first single, "Heaven", is a cover of the Bryan Adams song of the same name, released on 21 November 2001. It was produced in a collaboration with German producer Yanou with vocals by Dutch singer Do.

The second single, "Sunlight", was released on 15 May 2002 with vocals by Loona.

The third single, "The Boys of Summer", released on 18 November 2002, also features vocals by Loona; it is a cover of the Don Henley song of the same name.

Track listing

Notes
 signifies a co-producer.
 signifies an assistant producer.
 signifies a remixer.
The UK edition includes "California Dreamin'" as a hidden track appended to the end of track 11.

Personnel
Vocalists
Loona – vocals ("Sunlight", "California Dreamin'", "Beautiful Smile", "The Boys of Summer", "Sunlight (Bossa Nova Vibes)")
Do – vocals (	"Heaven", "Heaven (Candlelight mix)")
Mel – vocals ("The Boys of Summer")
Sitanshu Dasti – vocals ("El Cóndor Pasa")
Michelle Tabu – vocals ("Unbreakable")
DiCaprio – vocals ("Vive el Presente")
Vanda Guzman – vocals ("Take Me Back to Heaven")
Annabell Owusu-Ansah – backing vocals (Sunlight", "California Dreamin'", "Sunlight (Bossa Nova Vibes)")
Phil Barnes – vocals ("Irresistible")

Charts

Weekly charts

Year-end charts

References

Further reading

External links
 

2002 albums
DJ Sammy albums